Thirstier is the fifth studio album by American musician Torres. It was released on July 30, 2021, through Merge Records.

Background and release 
Thirstier follows Torres's 2020 album, Silver Tongue. Recorded in fall 2020 at Middle Farm Studios, UK, the album was produced by Torres with her long-time collaborators Rob Ellis and Peter Miles. It was mixed by TJ Allen. The record was announced in May 2021, alongside the cover-art and tracklist. The second track "Don't Go Puttin Wishes in My Head" was served as the first single from the album on 12 May. The title track was released as the album's second single on 14 July. Thirstier was released on 30 July 2021 by Merge Records.

Critical reception

At Metacritic, which assigns a weighted average rating out of 100 to reviews from mainstream publications, this release received an average score of 81, based on 14 reviews, indicating "universal acclaim". At AnyDecentMusic?, which collates album reviews from websites, magazines and newspapers, they gave the release a 7.8 out of 10, based on a critical consensus of 15 reviews.

Track listing 
All tracks have been written and produced by Torres and Rob Ellis.

Personnel
 Mackenzie Scott – vocalist, producer, writer
 Rob Ellis – producer, writer
 TJ Allen – mixing

Charts

References

2021 albums
Merge Records albums
Torres (musician) albums